MRV, project name, for Matériel Roulant Voyageurs  (Passenger Rolling Stock) are the future rolling stock for the new line 18 of the Paris Métro.

Background 
As part of the construction of line 18 of the Paris metro, the Société du Grand Paris launched a call for tenders in the first quarter of 2019 for the acquisition of new self-driving trains and associated systems.

In October 2021, the Société du Grand Paris announced that the manufacturer Alstom had been selected to supply 37 trains from the Alstom Metropolis range with three cars, automation systems and centralized operating command stations for a total amount of 400 million euros. A first firm tranche of 15 trains for an amount of 230 million euros has been ordered for delivery from 2024 and commercial entry into service of the new trains should take place when line 18 opens on its section from Massy - Palaiseau to CEA Saint-Aubin, scheduled for 2026.

The trains will be designed at the Alstom site in Petite-Forêt (Valenciennes).

Description 
The capacity of a complete train is 498 places including 54 seats. The MRV will use third-rail power supply and its maximum commercial speed will be .

Due to its unique characteristics, loading gauge, power supply and automation, the MRV will be specific to line 18 and unique in France.

Exterior 

The first exterior designs of the trains are unveiled at the end of November 2021. Île-de-France Mobilités opened an online consultation in early December 2021 for the final choice of the front of the train out of three proposed variants. After 15 days of consultation the third proposal, named “Pure fluidity”, was selected.

References 

MRV
Paris Métro line 18
Alstom multiple units
1500 V DC multiple units of France